Joseph Wong was the Canada Research Chair for health, democracy and development, is the Roz and Ralph Halbert Professor of Innovation at the Munk School of Global Affairs, and is currently the Vice President, International of the University of Toronto.

He is the author of Healthy Democracies: Welfare Politics In Taiwan and South Korea and Healthy Democracies: Welfare Politics In Taiwan and South Korea, and 'From Democracy to Development: The Transformations of Modern Asia,' co-authored with Dan Slater and published (2022) with Princeton University Press.

Education 
Wong has a bachelor’s degree from McGill University and both a Master's degree and a Ph.D from University of Wisconsin-Madison.

Career 
Wong has collaborated with the World Bank and United Nations and from 2005 to 2014, he was the Director of the Asian Institute at the Munk School of Global Affairs. While teaching at the Munk School he was awarded the University of Toronto Faculty of Arts and Science's Outstanding Teaching Award.

Wong is professor of political science at the University of Toronto, and the Roz and Ralph Halbert Professor of Innovation at the Munk School of Global Affairs. He has previously served both as the Associate Vice-President and as the Vice-Provost of the University of Toronto.

He was appointed as the Vice President, International at the University of Toronto in 2021 after being given the role on an interim basis in 2020. While working at the University of Toronto, Professor Wong helped introduce new academic designations as part of a wider effort to encourage more international study by Canadian students. Also at the University of Toronto, Wong founded the Reach Alliance, a student-led project that researches ways for organizations and governments to get essential services to marginalized people in the most difficult to reach locations.

He is often quoted in the media about issues affected international students in Canada, specifically about the revocation of scholarships supporting students from Saudi Arabia. He has also been quoted by international media about Taiwanese politics. Canadian media also reported his advocacy for free speech and his support for Afghan students.

He serves on the board of directors of Upper Canada College.

From 2006 to 2016, he held the Canada Research Chair in health, democracy and development.

Selected publications 

 Wong, Joseph, Betting on Biotech: Innovation and the Limits of Asia’s Developmental State, Cornell University Press, 2011, ISBN: 9780801450327, cited 181 times.
Wong, Joseph, Healthy Democracies: Welfare Politics In Taiwan and South Korea, Cornell University Press, 2018, ISBN: 9780801473494, cited 375 times.

See also 

 International students in Canada
 Canada–Saudi Arabia relations

References

External links 

 Munk School of Global Affairs
 Reach Alliance at University of Toronto

Living people
University of Toronto people
Academic staff of the University of Toronto
McGill University alumni
University of Wisconsin alumni
Canadian non-fiction writers
Canada Research Chairs
Year of birth missing (living people)
Canadian orientalists